Abington Friends Meeting House is a Quaker meeting house located in Jenkintown, Pennsylvania. The original meeting house was established from 1698 to 1699, with land and a 100 pounds sterling donated by John Barnes. In 1784, a separate school building was established for the Abington Friends School.

Notable people
 Elisha Tyson, abolitionist
Benjamin Lay, Quaker activist

References

Jenkintown, Pennsylvania
1699 establishments in Pennsylvania
Quaker meeting houses in Pennsylvania